The German Evangelical Church Assembly (German Deutscher Evangelischer Kirchentag, DEKT) is an assembly of lay members of the Evangelical Church in Germany, that organises biennial events of faith, culture and political discussion.

History
The biennial five-day convention, the main mission of the organisation, was founded in 1949 by laypeople, with the intention of strengthening the democratic culture, following Nazi rule and the Second World War.

During the 1970s and 1980s, Kirchentag was strongly affected by the peace movement and became a key platform for Christian pacifism.

Description
The German Evangelical Church Assembly sees itself as a free movement of people brought together by their Christian faith and engagement in the future of the Evangelical Church and wider society. The assembly partakes in bible study, lectures, and discussions, and also hosts concerts.

The five-day Kirchentag festival, or convention, takes place in a different German city every two years. This is the Assembly's main mission. These events bring together around 100,000 visitors, who participate for the whole period. It has achieved a high importance, as can be seen by many attending politicians, including the Chancellor and Federal President; Angela Merkel has been a frequent guest to the Assembly. The media impact, while the Kirchentag is held, is also considerable.

In 2015, the convention was held in Stuttgart.

Namesake
Between 1848 and 1872 conventions of Protestant clergy were held under the same German name as they are nowadays: Deutscher Evangelischer Kirchentag. For a description, see the Evangelical Church Conference.

References

External links
Official Website
www.kirchentag.org.uk British Committee of the Kirchentag

Protestant organizations
Protestantism in Germany
Lutheran pacifists
Recurring events established in 1949
1949 establishments in Germany